Missouri Township is one of ten townships in Boone County, Missouri, USA. As of the 2012, its population was 63,334. The township is western half of the City of Columbia making it the most populous township in Boone County.

History
Missouri Township was established in 1822. Settled mainly by settlers from the upland south (Kentucky, Virginia, and Tennessee), the township was named after the Missouri River, to which the township originally extended. The Columbia Cemetery and a small part of the original town plat lie in Missouri township.

Geography
The township contains only one incorporated settlement: Columbia. Hinkson Creek, the Flat Branch and County House Branch flow through the township eventually feeding into the Roche Perche which forms the western border. The township is the most populous and urbanized in Boone County.

References

External links
 City-Data.com

Townships in Boone County, Missouri
Townships in Missouri